United States v. Loew's Inc., 371 U.S. 38 (1962), was an antitrust case in which the Supreme Court of the United States held that block booking of movies—the offer of only a combined assortment of movies to an exhibitor—violates the Sherman Antitrust Act.

Besides its legal consequences, the court's decision affected economic theory, explaining product bundling as a form of price discrimination.

See also
 List of United States Supreme Court cases, volume 371
 International Salt Co. v. United States (1947)
 United States v. Paramount Pictures, Inc. (1948)

References

External links
 

1962 in United States case law
United States antitrust case law
United States Supreme Court cases
United States Supreme Court cases of the Warren Court
Business ethics cases
Loews Cineplex Entertainment